Coruña (possibly from Aymara for "to eat greedily") is a mountain in the Barroso mountain range in the Andes of Peru, about  high. It is situated in the Tacna Region, Tacna Province, Palca District, and in the Tarata Province, in the districts of Tarata and Tarucachi. Coruña lies southwest of Auquitaipe.

See also 
 Achacollo
 Huancune

References 

Mountains of Peru
Mountains of Tacna Region